Ghostlore or ghost-lore is a genre of folklore concerning ghosts. Ghostlore occurs throughout recorded history, including contemporary contexts.

History 
The first known recorded story to feature a haunted house is often regarded by folklore scholars as Mostellaria, which itself is believed to be an adaptation of a lost ghost story named Phasma written by the Athenian poet Philemon. Several centuries later, in the writings of Pliny the Younger, can be found the second-oldest mention of a haunted house in which the philosopher Athenodorus helps lay the bones of a restless spirit to rest.

Around the world

Scotland 

The Green Lady is a reoccurring character in many Scottish folktales. This folklore character is often associated with the many castles dotting the countryside. Examples of the green ladies include the Green Lady of Fyvie, Green Lady of Ashintully Castle, Green Lady of Ballindalloch Castle, Green Lady of the Barony of Ladyland, Green Lady of Crathes Castle, and the Green Lady of Knock Castle. The origin of the green lady appears to stem from the  Glaistig, which is a type of fuath from Scottish mythology. The Green Lady varies from story to story, in some stories she may act as a type of guardian angel, but in others she takes on the form of a vengeful spirit.

Ireland 
The Banshee is one of the most well known spirits in Irish folklore. Within these folktales, hearing a banshee's scream is viewed to portend the death of a family member. The banshees description changes significantly depending on the folktale, with the only consistent details generally being that the banshee is the spirit of a woman with long flowing hair who can be heard loudly keening in the countryside. In some variations of the tale the banshee is thought to be the spirit of a murdered woman or a mother who died in childbirth. The Scottish Bean Nighe is specifically the banshee of a woman who died during childbirth. The banshee is often depicted accompanying the death coach in European folklore.

Latin America 

In almost every Latin American country, you can find stories about the Sihuanaba, or horse-faced women. The Sihuanaba is said to lead unfaithful men into dangerous situations. Variations of the story exist, but in almost all of them, the spirit is a type of shapeshifter who exclusively preys on men. Name variations include Cihuanaba, Ciguanaba, and Ciguapa.

La Llorona, or The Wailer, is an extremely widespread folklore story within Latin American countries. Many different versions of the La Llorona story exist, but generally they focus on the spirit's intense grief for her lost children.

China 

'鬼' (Mandarin pinyin: guǐ) is the general Chinese term for ghost which itself is a derivative of the verb "wei 威", which means "awe inspiring”. Belief in ghosts in China is widespread and is often closely associated with ancestor worship. Ghosts have been the subject of censorship in China at various times.

The United States of America 
Resurrection Mary, a "vanishing hitchhiker" is considered to be Chicago's most famous ghost. Some ghost stories in Alabama can be traced to the folklore of the Choctaw. As many of the state's early settlers were of Scotch-Irish heritage, their tales contain a number of European motifs. According to Jones, ghostlore is more prominent in rural areas. New York state's ghostlore is most readily found the state's earliest settled region: either side of the Hudson River from Newburgh to Troy, and along the Mohawk Valley from Cohoes to Utica. Jones argues that "[f]or ghostlore to thrive one needs a section that has been settled for a considerable length of time, where the houses are old, and at least a fair share of the population is permanent."

Locations 
Specific locations associated with death or tragedy quickly gain a local reputation for being haunted quicker than more benign places and as a result appear disproportionately within ghostlore stories from all over the world. Some examples of these locations include:

Cemeteries 
Cemeteries often quickly become the subject of many ghost stories and frequently appear in the recorded folklore from all over the world. Popular local examples of cemeteries that have gained a reputation within folklore for being haunted include Bachelor's Grove Cemetery, Chase Vault, Jeruk Purut Cemetery, and Union Cemetery.

College Campuses 
The architecture of many older buildings on college campuses resembles that of buildings described in nineteenth-century literary ghost stories and Gothic novels. Often these buildings become the setting for ghostly legends. According to professor Elizabeth Tucker, "[b]y telling ghost stories, students transform their college buildings into mysterious and magical places." The stories serve to "initiate entering students into a new community."

Highways 
The haunted highway is a reoccurring theme in many folklore tales from all over the globe. One of the best examples from the United States of America is Clinton Road in New Jersey, but there are many others. In more rural areas the haunted highway will take on the form of a haunted street, road, or even trails. Examples of roads around the globe with attached ghostlore include the Kuala Lumpur–Karak Expressway, A21 Sevenoaks Bypass, and the Tuen Mun Road.

Railroads 
A particular subset of ghostlore is that concerning the railroad. The most famous of the ghost trains, at least in The United States of America, is that of Abraham Lincoln's funeral train.

Hospitals 
Hospitals are perhaps one of the most common backdrops for a haunted location story and this type of ghostlore can be found all over the globe. One common aspect of these stories is that the ghosts are either the former patients or the staff themselves and typically act as the vengeful spirits of those who died there, or those who wish to cause suffering from beyond the grave. Popular examples of the haunted asylum are Ararat Lunatic Asylum in Australia, Nummela Sanatorium in Finland, and Changi Hospital in Singapore. The haunted hospital folktale may often be a mental health hospital, but this is not always the case and there are many general hospitals with a haunted reputation.

Observations 
American folklorist Louis C. Jones observed the following in 1944:

"Ghostlore is still widespread and popular. While most of the actions thought to be common among ghosts (chain clanking, cemetery haunting, and so forth) can be found, they are by no means so widespread in the popular ghostlore as we have been led to expect. The ghost who is very like the living is far more common than any other… It might be expected that a rational age of science would destroy belief in the ability of the dead to return. I think it works the other way: in an age of scientific miracles anything seems possible."Jones lists several reasons why ghosts return and interact with the living. Among these are to complete unfinished business, to warn and inform, to punish and protest, to guard and protect, and to reward the living. 

Folklorist Linda Dégh observed in her 2001 work Legend and belief the following: "The legend touches upon the most sensitive areas of our existence, and its manifest forms cannot be isolated as simple coherent stories. Rather, legends appear as products of conflicting opinions, expressed in conversation. They manifest in discussions, contradictions, additions, implementations, corrections, approvals, and disapprovals during some or all phases of their transmission, from their inception through various courses of elaboration, variation, decline, and revitalization."Stories often draw from the general history of an area or from specific historical incidents. Researcher Alan Brown believes that "[t]he association between ghosts and dilapidated houses is conventional."  Brown notes that some stories cease to be passed down once the setting has been significantly altered, as in the case of a "haunted house" demolished.

References

Notes

 

Ghosts
Folklore